Albert Tuipulotu (born February 27, 1979 in San Mateo) is an American rugby union centre. He is a member of the United States national rugby union team and participated with the squad at the 2007 Rugby World Cup.
As a HS Football player, Tuipulotu completed a senior season with 45 touchdowns and 2,640 yards gained, both Northern California one-season records, to earn recognition by The Examiner as Player of the Year on the 1996 San Francisco-Metro All-Star Football Team.

References

1979 births
Living people
Rugby union scrum-halves
American rugby union players
United States international rugby union players